Ouanaminthe Football Club is a professional football club based in Ouanaminthe, Haiti.

History
The club was founded in 2011 as 9 Capitaines, and then renamed to Les Capitaines; until finally renaming to its current name in April 2014 by recommendation of the Haitian Football Federation.

References

Football clubs in Haiti
Association football clubs established in 2011
Nord-Est (department)